Qaleh Asgar Rural District is a rural district (dehestan) in Lalehzar District, Bardsir County, Kerman Province, Iran. At the 2006 census, its population was 3,930, in 938 families. The rural district has 37 villages.

References 

Rural Districts of Kerman Province
Bardsir County